Finland competed at the 1968 Winter Olympics in Grenoble, France.

Medalists

Alpine skiing

Men

Men's slalom

Biathlon

Men

 1 One minute added per close miss (a hit in the outer ring), two minutes added per complete miss.

Men's 4 x 7.5 km relay

 2 A penalty loop of 200 metres had to be skied per missed target.

Cross-country skiing

Men

Men's 4 × 10 km relay

Women

Women's 3 x 5 km relay

Ice hockey

First round

 Finland -   Yugoslavia 11:2 (3:0, 6:0, 2:2) 
Goalscorers: Lasse Oksanen 2, Esa Peltonen 2, Matti Reunamaki 2, Juhani Wahlsten, Veli-Pekka Ketola, Matti Keinonen, Matti Harju, Pekka Leimu - Albin Felc, Franc Smolej.

Final Round 

 
 USSR –  Finland 8:0  (3:0, 2:0, 3:0)
Goalscorers: Staršinov 2, Mišakov 2, Zimin 2, Firsov, Populanov. 
Referees: Bucala, Kořínek (TCH)

 Canada –  Finland 2:5  (1:2, 0:1, 1:2)
Goalscorers: O’Shea, McMillan – Keinonen, Oksanen, J. Peltonen, Koskela, Wahlsten.
Referees: Trumble (USA), Seglin (URS)

  Czechoslovakia –  Finland 4:3  (0:1, 3:0, 1:2) 
Goalscorers: Nedomanský 2, Golonka, Havel – Keinonen, Ketola, Oksanen.
Referees: Wiking (SWE), Snětkov (URS)

  Sweden –  Finland 5:1  (1:0, 2:1, 2:0) 
Goalscorers: Wickberg 2, Granholm, Nillsson, Bengsston – Oksanen.
Referees: Kubinec (CAN), Kořínek (TCH)

 East Germany –  Finland 2:3  (1:2, 0:1, 1:0) 
Goalscorers: R. Noack, Peters – Harju 2, Keinonen.
Referees: Bucala (TCH), Dahlberg (SWE)

 Finland–  West Germany  4:1  (2:1, 1:0, 1:0)
Goalscorers: Leimu 2, Ketola, J. Peltonen – Schloder.
Referees: Kořínek, Bucala (TCH)

 USA –  Finland 1:1  (1:1, 0:0, 0:0)
Goalscorers: Volmar – Wahlsten.
Referees: Kubinec (CAN), Seglin (URS)

Contestants
Team Roster
Urpo Ylönen
Ilpo Koskela
Paavo Tirkkonen
Juha Rantasila
Pekka Kuusisto
Lalli Partinen
Seppo Lindström
Matti Reunamäki
Juhani Wahlsten
Matti Keinonen
Lasse Oksanen
Jorma Peltonen
Esa Peltonen
Kari Johansson
Veli-Pekka Ketola
Matti Harju
Pekka Leimu

Nordic combined 

Events:
 normal hill ski jumping 
 15 km cross-country skiing

Ski jumping

Speed skating

Men

Women

References

Official Olympic Reports
International Olympic Committee results database
 Olympic Winter Games 1968, full results by sports-reference.com

Nations at the 1968 Winter Olympics
1968
1968 in Finnish sport